Eastshore may refer to:

Places
United States
 Eastshore State Park, in California
 Eastshore, Kansas, an unincorporated community

Other
 East Shore and Suburban Railway
 Eastshore Freeway